The Central District of Boyer-Ahmad County is a district (bakhsh) in Boyer-Ahmad County, Kohgiluyeh and Boyer-Ahmad Province, Iran. At the 2006 census, its population was 174,846, in 36,361 families.  The District has two cities: Yasuj and Madavan-e Olya. The District has five rural districts (dehestan): Dasht-e Rum Rural District, Kakan Rural District, Sarrud-e Jonubi Rural District, Sarrud-e Shomali Rural District, and Sepidar Rural District.

References 

Districts of Kohgiluyeh and Boyer-Ahmad Province
Boyer-Ahmad County